Rosthwaite may refer to:

Rosthwaite Fell, a summit overlooking Borrowdale in the English Lake District